is a former Nippon Professional Baseball pitcher.

External links

1967 births
Butte Copper Kings players
Chunichi Dragons players
Japanese baseball coaches
Japanese expatriate baseball players in the United States
Living people
Nippon Professional Baseball coaches
Nippon Professional Baseball pitchers
Pawtucket Red Sox players
Portland Sea Dogs players
Seibu Lions players
Baseball people from Okinawa Prefecture
Yokohama BayStars players
Yokohama Taiyō Whales players